Piton State College (PSC) is a state secondary school based in Piton, Mauritius. Students are prepared for the School Certificate and the Higher School Certificate that are carried out through the Cambridge International Examinations(CIE). Piton State College is owned and controlled by the Government of Mauritius through the Ministry of Education of Mauritius.

History
The Foundation Stone was laid on Wednesday 29 May 2002 and the inauguration was done on Friday 7 November 2003. The school was given the name Piton Form VI College (Boys) on 29 May 2002 and was renamed Piton State College on 7 November 2003. In January 2006, as a result of a policy decision of the Government, the school started admitting pupils from form I -VI. The school population is around 863 students, number of teaching staff is 53 and number of non-teaching staff is 17. Leckraj Sharma Hurbhookun became the  first laureate in 2019.

See also 
 Education in Mauritius
 List of secondary schools in Mauritius

References

External links

Secondary schools in Mauritius
Boys' schools in Mauritius
Educational institutions established in 2002
2002 establishments in Mauritius